Arthur Hamilton Lewis (16 September 1901 – 23 August 1980) was an English first-class cricketer who represented Hampshire in one first-class match during the 1929 season, against Surrey.

Lewis was born in Maseru in what is now Lesotho (previously part of the British colony of Basutoland). He is one of only a handful of first-class cricketers to be born in that country.

In 1931, Lewis joined Berkshire, where he represented them in the Minor Counties Championship. Lewis made his debut for the club against Cornwall and would go on to represent the county in 35 Minor Counties matches. His final Minor Counties match came in the 1937 season against Oxfordshire. After the 1937 season Lewis retired from representative cricket.

Lewis died in Heavitree, Devon on 23 August 1980.

Notes

External links

1901 births
1980 deaths
People from Maseru
English cricketers
Hampshire cricketers
Berkshire cricketers
Lesotho cricketers